The ARIA Digital Track Chart is a chart that ranks the best-performing digital tracks singles of Australia. It is published by Australian Recording Industry Association (ARIA), an organisation who collect music data for the weekly ARIA Charts. To be eligible to appear on the chart, the recording must be a single not an EP and only paid downloads counted from downloadable outlets.

Chart history

Number-one artists

See also
2016 in music
ARIA Charts
List of number-one singles of 2016 (Australia)

References

Australia Digital Tracks
Digital 2016
Number-one Digital Songs